Griffith Lewis was Dean of Gloucester from 1594 until his death in early June 1607: he was buried at Hereford Cathedral.

References

17th-century English Anglican priests
16th-century English Anglican priests
Deans of Gloucester